Technology Building station is a station on Brown Line of the Taipei Metro, located in Daan District, Taipei, Taiwan.

Station overview

The three-level, elevated station has two side platforms and one exit. It connects with the Technology Building, which houses Taiwan's Ministry of Science and Technology, as well as other businesses. It is located on Fuxing South Rd., near its intersection with Heping East Rd. Between this station and the adjacent Liuzhangli, there is a 90-degree turn.

Station layout

Exits	
Single Exit: Near the intersection of Fuxing S. Rd. Sec. 2

Around the station
 National Science and Technology Council
 Taiwan Intellectual Property Office
 Wang Yun-wu Memorial Hall

References

Railway stations opened in 1996
Wenhu line stations